Gurumoorthi is a 2022 Indian Tamil-language drama film directed by K. P. Tanasekar. The film stars Natty, Ramki,  Poonam Bajwa and Manobala in the lead roles. It was released on 9 December 2022.

Cast

Production
The film began production in January 2022 and was shot across the Nilgiris’ district, and in areas like Pondicherry, Putheri in Kerala and the border areas of Tamil Nadu.

Soundtrack
Soundtrack was composed by Sathya Dev Uthayashankar.
Kungfu Panda - Srinidhi Sriprakash
Sekka Sevantha - Roshini JKV
Ennodu Nee - MC Vickey, Smile Tupakeys
Thaaragaye - Vallavan Chandrasekaran

Reception
The film was released across Tamil Nadu on 9 December 2022. A critic from Times of India noted it was "an amateurishly made suspense drama that is crass, melodramatic and bloated". A reviewer from Maalai Malar noted that the film was "low on enjoyment".

References

External links

2022 films
2020s Tamil-language films